Żółkiewka  is a village in Krasnystaw County, Lublin Voivodeship, in eastern Poland. It is the seat of the gmina (administrative district) called Gmina Żółkiewka.

The village has a population of 790.

History

The earliest mention of Żółkiewka (then named Żółkiew) occurs in historical documents from 1359. In 1702 the village received town status, later it acquired its current name. In 1868 it lost its town status and reverted to being a village.  According to the 1921 census the village had a Jewish community consisting of 1308 people, or 64.6 percent of its total population. The Jewish community perished in the Holocaust, and was not reconstituted afterwards.

In Żółkiewka, there is a Roman Catholic church of Saint Lawrence with illusionistic monumental paintings (1776) signed by painter Gabriel Sławiński.

References

Villages in Krasnystaw County
Lublin Governorate
Holocaust locations in Poland